James Robert Wilkes (born April 1, 1958) is an American former professional basketball player.  Born in Nashville, Tennessee, Wilkes was raised in Los Angeles, where he attended Susan Miller Dorsey High School. In his senior year, he was named 1976 Los Angeles City Section 4A co-player of the year as he led Dorsey to the city championship.

Wlikes then attended UCLA; as a 6'7" forward, he was regarded as a defensive specialist and was often assigned to guard the opponent's top scoring forward. In the third round of the 1980 NBA draft, Wilkes was selected by the Chicago Bulls. He played three NBA seasons (1980–1983) with the Bulls and Detroit Pistons, scoring 547 total points.

External links
Career statistics

1958 births
Living people
Basketball players from Nashville, Tennessee
Chicago Bulls draft picks
Chicago Bulls players
Detroit Pistons players
Detroit Spirits players
Parade High School All-Americans (boys' basketball)
Small forwards
UCLA Bruins men's basketball players
American men's basketball players
Susan Miller Dorsey High School alumni